The Logistic Regiment "Sassari" is a military logistics regiment of the Italian Army based in Cagliari in Sardinia. The regiment is the logistic unit of the Mechanized Brigade "Sassari" and was established on 1 November 2019. The regiment has been assigned the flag of the Logistic Battalion "Cremona", which was stationed in Sardinia during the World War II.

Mission 
The Logistic Regiment "Sassari" provides logistic autonomy through projectable and close-support logistics to the Mechanized Brigade "Sassari".

History 
The establishment of a logistic unit for the Sassari brigade was advocated for by several Sardinian politicians and the raising of the unit began in March 2019. In June 2019, the Parliament authorized the establishment of the Logistic Regiment.

The Regiment was declared operational on 1 November 2019 and on the 29 of the same month the regiment's troops took their oath in front of the newly arrived the flag.

Logistic Battalion "Cremona" 
On 1 November 2019 the Logistic Regiment "Sassari" received the flag of the Logistic Battalion "Cremona", which had been formed on 1 November 1956 as Services Unit "Cremona" in Turin by merging the logistic and support units of the Infantry Division "Cremona".

The Infantry Division "Cremona" descended from the World War II 44th Infantry Division "Cremona", which had been sent to Sardinia in March 1941. When Italy and Germany occupied Vichy France in Operation "Anton" after Allied troops had landed in French North Africa the division was ferried to Southern Corsica on 8 November 1942 and remained there until the announcement of the Armistice of Cassibile on 8 September 1943. From 9 September 1943 the Cremona and its sister division the 20th Infantry Division "Friuli" fought the retreating German Sturmbrigade Reichsführer SS and 90th Panzergrenadier Division and the Italian XII Paratroopers Battalion/ 184th Paratroopers Regiment of the 184th Airborne Division "Nembo", The Cremona division in Zonza and Quenza, pushing north to Golo river and Sorbo-Ocagnano. After the end of operations on Corsica the Cremona returned to Sardinia. In September 1944 the division was reduced to two infantry (21st Infantry Regiment "Cremon", 22nd Infantry Regiment "Cremon") and one artillery regiment (7th Artillery Regiment "Cremon"), armed with British weapons and materiel and renamed Combat Group "Cremona". The Cremona entered the front on 12 January 1945 as part of the British V Corps and when allied forces achieved a major breakthrough during the 1945 spring offensive the Cremona advanced towards Venice and liberated the city on 30 April 1945.

On 1 January 1972 the Services Unit "Cremona" was reformed as Services Grouping "Cremona" with a command platoon, a transport unit, a medical battalion, and a provisions supply company in Turin, and the Supply, Repairs, Recovery Unit "Cremona" in Venaria Reale. During the 1975 army reform the Infantry Division "Cremona" was reduced to Motorized Brigade "Cremona" and the services grouping was reformed as Logistic Battalion "Cremona", which received all the traditions of the preceding logistic, transport, medical, maintenance, and supply units of the Cremona divisions. The battalion was granted a flag on 12 November 1976 by decree 846 of the President of the Italian Republic Giovanni Leone.

Initially consisting of a command platoon, a supply and transport company, a medium workshop, and a field park the battalion was reorganized on 1 October 1981 and consisted from then until being disbanded of the following units:

  Battalion Command, in Turin
 Command and Services Company
 Supply Company
 Medium Transport Company
 Maintenance Company
 Medical (Reserve) Unit

On 5 November 1996 the Logistic Battalion "Cremona" was disbanded and parts of it were incorporated in the 1st Military Region Logistic Unit "Monviso". Afterwards the flag of the Logistic Battalion "Cremona" was transferred to the Shrine of the Flags in the Vittoriano in Rome, where it remained until 28 October 2019.

Current structure 
Like all Italian Army brigade logistic units the Logistic Regiment "Sassari" consists of:

  Regimental Command, in Cagliari
 Logistic Battalion
 Command
 Tactical Control Squad
 Supply Company
 Transport Company
 Maintenance Company
 Command and Logistic Support Company
 C3 Platoon
 Transport and Materiel Platoon
 Deployment Support Platoon
 Commissariat Platoon
 Garrison Support Unit

The Regimental Command consists of the Commandant's and Personnel Office, the Operations, Training and Information Office, the Logistic Office, and the Administration Office.

See also 
 Military logistics

References 

Logistic Regiments of Italy
Military units and formations established in 2019